There are over 3,000 Listed Buildings in and around Ashford, Kent, which are buildings of architectural historic interest.

Grade I buildings are of national importance and have outstanding architectural or historic interest.
Grade II* buildings have some national significance and have outstanding architectural or historic interest.
Grade II buildings are of national interest and are a major element of the local environment.



References

Borough of Ashford
Ashford
Lists of listed buildings in Kent